Flattnitzer See, also known as Hemmasee, is a lake near Flattnitz Pass in the Gurktal Alps. It rests in the municipality of Glödnitz, in Carinthia, Austria.

References

Lakes of Carinthia (state)
Lakes of Austria